Dominika Novak Jablonska (born 20 August 1985), is a Polish actress. She is best known for the roles in the popular television serials and films The Runaway, Mary and Martha and The Forgiven.

Personal life
She was born on 20 August 1985 in Łódź, Poland. In 1990, she moved to South Africa and later matriculating from the National School of The Arts in Johannesburg. Then she accepted a scholarship to study a degree in the Health Sciences. However, she left the scholarship after a year and return to dramatic arts. In 2009, she graduated with her BA in Theatre & Performance at the University of Cape Town.

Career
She has since worked extensively in casting and currently acts, directs and produces in South Africa. In 2006, she played her debut acting role with a minor role in the television movies Krakatoa: Volcano of Destruction. Then in 2010, she received the supportive role 'Julia Carvalho' in the television series League of Glory.

Then she appeared in several television movies, mini-serials and soap operas such as; The Runaway, Wild at Heart and Mary and Martha. In the meantime, she joined the television movies as the casting assistant, such as The Girl, Labyrinth and Flight of the Storks. In 2014, she made her maiden film acting with the film Knysna, where she played a minor role 'Debra'.

Filmography

References

External links
 

Living people
South African film actresses
South African television actresses
1985 births
British television actresses
British film actresses
Polish film actresses
Polish television actresses